The Japanese destroyer {{nihongo|Nire|楡|}} was one of 21 s built for the Imperial Japanese Navy (IJN) in the late 1910s. She survived the Pacific War and was subsequently scrapped by mid-1948.

Design and description
The Momi class was designed with higher speed and better seakeeping than the preceding  second-class destroyers. Nire was powered by two Brown-Curtis geared steam turbines, each driving one propeller shaft using steam provided by three Kampon water-tube boilers. Their crew consisted of 110 officers and crewmen.

The main armament of the Momi-class ships consisted of three  Type 3 guns in single mounts; one gun forward of the well deck, one between the two funnels, and the last gun atop the aft superstructure. The guns were numbered '1' to '3' from front to rear. The ships carried two above-water twin sets of  torpedo tubes; one mount was in the well deck between the forward superstructure and the bow gun and the other between the aft funnel and aft superstructure.

Construction and career
Nire, built at the Kure Naval Arsenal, was launched on 22 December 1919 and completed on 31 March 1920. She was disarmed in 1939 and became a tender the following year. The ship became a training ship on 15 December 1944 and was renamed Tomariura No. 1. The ship was scrapped at Uraga by 15 August 1948.

Notes

References

1919 ships
Ships built by Kure Naval Arsenal
Momi-class destroyers